Johnson City is a city and the county seat of Blanco County, Texas, United States. The population was 1,656 at the 2010 census. Founded in 1879 by James P. Johnson, it was named for early settler Sam E. Johnson, Sr. Johnson City is part of the Texas-German belt region.

History
Johnson City was founded by James P. Johnson who donated a  site on the Pedernales River for the founding of the town in 1879. It was the hometown of Lyndon B. Johnson, 36th U.S. president. The county seat of Blanco County was moved to Johnson City in 1890.

Geography
U.S. Routes 281 and 290 join near the center of town; US 281 leads north  to Marble Falls, and US 290 leads west  to Fredericksburg. The two highways run south out of town together; US 290 soon turns east and leads  to Austin, while US 281 continues south  to San Antonio.

Climate
Johnson City experiences a humid subtropical climate, with hot summers and a generally comfortable winter.

Demographics

2020 census

As of the 2020 United States census, there were 1,627 people, 725 households, and 415 families residing in the city.

2000 census
As of the census of 2000, there were 1,191 people, 442 households, and 317 families residing in the city. The population density was 891.7 people per square mile (343.2/km2). There were 490 housing units at an average density of 366.9 per square mile (141.2/km2). The racial makeup of the city was 89.67% White, 0.84% Native American, 0.17% Asian, 8.23% from other races, and 1.09% from two or more races. Hispanic or Latino of any race were 20.57% of the population.

There were 442 households, out of which 36.9% had children under the age of 18 living with them, 56.6% were married couples living together, 11.3% had a female householder with no husband present, and 28.1% were non-families. 24.0% of all households were made up of individuals, and 12.7% had someone living alone who was 65 years of age or older. The average household size was 2.57 and the average family size was 3.07.

In the city, the population was spread out, with 28.0% under the age of 18, 6.5% from 18 to 24, 27.3% from 25 to 44, 21.2% from 45 to 64, and 17.1% who were 65 years of age or older. The median age was 37 years. For every 100 females, there were 88.2 males. For every 100 females age 18 and over, there were 84.5 males.

The median income for a household in the city was $34,148, and the median income for a family was $39,375. Males had a median income of $30,529 versus $21,607 for females. The per capita income for the city was $14,977. About 9.2% of families and 12.5% of the population were below the poverty line, including 17.8% of those under age 18 and 11.8% of those age 65 or over.

Parks and recreation

Selah, Bamberger Ranch Preserve is a nearby  wildlife sanctuary with a man-made batcave.

Education
Johnson City is served by the Johnson City Independent School District. The district has an elementary school, middle school and high school. Students attend Lyndon B. Johnson High School.

Media

Newspaper
The Johnson City Record Courier is a weekly newspaper published in Johnson City. It was established in 1883.

Radio
KFAN-FM/107.9 is licensed to serve Johnson City.

References

External links
 
 City of Johnson City official website
 Johnson City Chamber of Commerce
 Johnson City Record Courier
 
 Lyndon B. Johnson National Historical Park
 Johnson City Independent School District
 City-Data.com

Cities in Texas
Cities in Blanco County, Texas
County seats in Texas
Populated places established in 1879